The Association of American Cancer Institutes (AACI) is a membership association of 106 academic and freestanding cancer research centers in the United States and Canada. AACI's membership roster consists of National Cancer Institute (NCI)-designated centers and academic-based cancer research programs that receive National Institute of Health (NIH) and NCI support.

The association is headquartered in Pittsburgh, Pennsylvania. AACI cancer centers serve as the location for most NCI-sponsored clinical trials.

In addition to providing their local populations ready access to a wide array of cancer specialists—multidisciplinary experts in prevention, diagnosis, treatment, and cancer care—AACI cancer centers have developed partnerships with local community and state health agencies to design and implement programs aimed at reducing the overall cancer burden of the region.

AACI members

United States

Alabama 
 UAB Comprehensive Cancer Center, University of Alabama at Birmingham

Arizona 
The University of Arizona Cancer Center

Arkansas 
 Winthrop P. Rockefeller Cancer Institute, University of Arkansas for Medical Sciences

California 
 City of Hope National Medical Center Comprehensive Cancer Center and Beckman Research Institute
 Jonsson Comprehensive Cancer Center, UCLA
 Loma Linda University Cancer Center
 Rebecca and John Moores UCSD Cancer Center, University of California at San Diego
Samuel Oschin Comprehensive Cancer Institute, Cedars-Sinai Medical Center 
 Sanford-Burnham Medical Research Institute
 Stanford University Comprehensive Cancer Center
 UC Davis Comprehensive Cancer Center, The University of California, Davis Medical Center
 UCI Chao Family Comprehensive Cancer Center, University of California at Irvine
 UCSF Helen Diller Family Comprehensive Cancer Center and Cancer Research Institute
 USC Norris Comprehensive Cancer CenterUniversity of Southern California

Colorado 
 University of Colorado Cancer Center, University of Colorado Denver

Connecticut 
 Yale Cancer Center, Yale University School of Medicine

District of Columbia 
 The George Washington University Cancer Institute
 Lombardi Cancer Center at Georgetown University

Florida 
 University of Florida Health Cancer Center
 Sylvester Comprehensive Cancer Center, University of Miami School of Medicine
 H. Lee Moffitt Cancer Center & Research Institute

Georgia 
 Georgia Health Sciences University Cancer Center
Winship Cancer Institute of Emory University

Hawaii 
 University of Hawaii Cancer Center, University of Hawaii at Manoa

Illinois 
 Cardinal Bernardin Cancer Center of Loyola University Health System
 The Robert H. Lurie Comprehensive Cancer Center of Northwestern University
 Simmons Cancer Institute at Southern Illinois University
 University of Chicago Comprehensive Cancer Center
 University of Illinois at Chicago Cancer Center

Indiana 
 Indiana University Cancer Center
 Purdue Cancer Center

Iowa 
 Holden Comprehensive Cancer Center, University of Iowa

Kansas 
 The University of Kansas Cancer Center

Kentucky 
 Brown Cancer Center, University of Louisville Health Care
Markey Cancer Center, University of Kentucky

Louisiana 
 Feist-Weiller Cancer Center, LSU Health Shreveport
 Louisiana Cancer Research Consortium of New Orleans
Consortium Members:
Stanley S. Scott Cancer Center
Tulane Cancer Center

Maine 
The Jackson Laboratory Cancer Center

Maryland 
 Sidney Kimmel Comprehensive Cancer Center at Johns Hopkins University
 University of Maryland Greenebaum Cancer Center
 Murtha Cancer Center at Walter Reed National Military Medical Center Bethesda

Massachusetts 
Boston University Cancer Center
Dana–Farber Cancer Institute, Harvard Medical School

Michigan 
Barbara Ann Karmanos Cancer Institute, Wayne State University
University of Michigan Rogel Cancer Center

Minnesota 
Masonic Cancer Center University of Minnesota
 Mayo Clinic Cancer Center

Mississippi 
 University of Mississippi Medical Center Cancer Institute

Missouri 
 Siteman Cancer Center at Barnes-Jewish Hospital

Nebraska 
 Fred and Pamela Buffett Cancer Center (formerly UNMC Eppley Cancer Center)

New Hampshire 
Dartmouth-Hitchcock Norris Cotton Cancer Center

New Jersey 
Rutgers Cancer Institute of New Jersey

New Mexico 
 University of New Mexico Comprehensive Cancer Center

New York 
Albert Einstein Cancer Center, Montefiore Medical Center
Cold Spring Harbor Laboratory Cancer Center
 Herbert Irving Comprehensive Cancer Center, Columbia University Medical Center
Laura and Isaac Perlmutter Cancer Center, NYU Langone
Memorial Sloan Kettering Cancer Center
Roswell Park Comprehensive Cancer Center
 Stony Brook University Cancer Center, State University of New York
 The Tisch Cancer Institute at the Mount Sinai Health System
Upstate Cancer Center, SUNY Upstate Medical University
Wilmot Cancer Center, University of Rochester Medical Center

North Carolina 
Duke Cancer Institute, Duke University Medical Center
 UNC Lineberger Comprehensive Cancer Center, University of North Carolina at Chapel Hill
Wake Forest Baptist Comprehensive Cancer Center

Ohio 
Case Comprehensive Cancer Center 
 Cleveland Clinic Taussig Cancer Institute, The Cleveland Clinic Foundation
 The Ohio State University Comprehensive Cancer Center - James Cancer Hospital & Solove Research Institute
University of Cincinnati Cancer Institute

Oklahoma 
 Stephenson Cancer Center, University of Oklahoma

Oregon 
 Knight Cancer Institute, Oregon Health & Science University

Pennsylvania 
 Abramson Cancer Center of the University of Pennsylvania
 Fox Chase Cancer Center, Temple Health
 Penn State Cancer Institute
Sidney Kimmel Cancer Center at Thomas Jefferson University
 The Wistar Institute
UPMC Hillman Cancer Center

Puerto Rico 

 University of Puerto Rico Comprehensive Cancer Center

Rhode Island 

 Cancer Center at Brown University

South Carolina 
 Hollings Cancer Center, Medical University of South Carolina

Tennessee 
 Comprehensive Cancer Center, St. Jude Children's Research Hospital
 Vanderbilt-Ingram Cancer Center

Texas 
 Dan L Duncan Cancer Center at Baylor College of Medicine
LIVESTRONG Cancer Institutes at University of Texas Austin/Dell Medical School
 Mays Cancer Center, UT Health San Antonio
 Simmons Comprehensive Cancer Center, UT Southwestern Medical Center
University of Texas MD Anderson Cancer Center
University of Texas Medical Branch Cancer Center

Utah 
 Huntsman Cancer Institute, University of Utah

Vermont 
 The University of Vermont Cancer Center

Virginia 
 University of Virginia Cancer Center
VCU Massey Cancer Center

Washington 
 Fred Hutchinson Cancer Research Center

West Virginia 
WVU Cancer Institute

Wisconsin 
 Medical College of Wisconsin Cancer Center
 University of Wisconsin Carbone Cancer Center

Canada

British Columbia 
 BC Cancer

Ontario 
 Princess Margaret Cancer Centre, University Health Network

References

External links
 Official website

Cancer organizations based in the United States
Medical and health organizations based in Pennsylvania